Shenzhen Salubris Pharmaceuticals is a Chinese pharmaceutical company.

Founded in November 1998 and based in Shenzhen, it has a market cap of US$4.4 billion, 3,121 employees and annual sales of $553 million as of 2019.

Shenzhen Salubris is headed by  the billionaire Ye Chenghai.

References

Companies based in Shenzhen
Companies listed on the Shenzhen Stock Exchange
Pharmaceutical companies of China
Chinese companies established in 1998